Rockers is a 1978 Jamaican film by Theodoros Bafaloukos. Several popular reggae artists star in the movie, including Leroy "Horsemouth" Wallace, Burning Spear, Gregory Isaacs, Big Youth, Dillinger, Robbie Shakespeare, and Jacob Miller.

Rockers was originally intended to be a documentary but blossomed into a full-length feature showing the reggae culture at its peak. With a budget of JA$500,000 (about $40,000), the film was completed in two months.

The film features authentic culture, characters and mannerisms. The main rocker Leroy "Horsemouth" Wallace, for example, is shown living with his actual wife and kids and in his own home.

The recording studios shown are the famous Harry J Studios where many roots reggae artists recorded during the 1970s including Bob Marley. The film includes Kiddus I's recording of "Graduation In Zion" at the studio, which he happened to be recording when Bafaloukos visited the studio.

Rockers premiered at the 1978 San Francisco Film Festival and had a theatrical release in the US in 1980.

Samples of the film's dialogue were used in the early 1990s jungle track, "Babylon" by Splash, "Terrorist Dub" by Californian ragga-metal band Insolence, in the track "Zion Youth" from the 1995 album Second Light by Dreadzone and in 2012 in the song "Smoke" by Inner Terrestrials.

In 2018, Wallace, Kiddus I, and Big Youth came together to perform two shows in São Paulo, Brazil, to commemorate the 40th anniversary of the film.

Plot
Horsemouth, a drummer living in a ghetto of Kingston plans to make some extra money selling and  distributing records.  He buys a motorcycle to carry them to the sound systems around the island.  The film starts as a loose interpretation of  Vittorio de Sica’s The Bicycle Thief and turns into a reggae interpretation of the Robin Hood myth.

Cast
 Leroy "Horsemouth" Wallace as himself
 Richard "Dirty Harry" Hall as himself
 Gregory "Jah Tooth" Isaacs as himself
 Jacob "Jakes" Miller as himself
 Robert "Robbie" Shakespeare as himself
 Frank Dowding as Kiddus I (himself)
 Winston Rodney as Burning Spear (himself)
 Manley Buchanan as Big Youth (himself)
 Lester Bullocks as Dillinger (himself)
 Jack Ruby as himself
 Peter Francis Honiball as Mr Honeyball (himself). Part of the film was shot at Honiball's home, called Hightide at Rosemount in the Parish of St James.

See also 
 Rockers (soundtrack) (1979)
 The Harder They Come (1972)

References

External links

 Pop Matters review link
 Reggae Films website link
 Rockers DVD review

1978 films
Jamaican comedy films
1978 comedy-drama films
Reggae films
Films set in Jamaica
Stoner films
Jamaican drama films
1970s English-language films